Francesco Morelli (ca. 1767 – ca. 1830) was a French-Italian painter and engraver. He was active in Naples and known as a painter or engraver of Pompeian subjects.

He was born in the Franche-Comté, and then traveled to Rome. He completed a series of engravings depicting the so-called Villa of Horace in Licenza with Hackert and Luigi Sabatelli.

Another Francesco Morelli from Florence was the first and dear mentor of Giovanni Baglione.

References

Year of death missing
18th-century Italian painters
Italian male painters
Italian engravers
Neo-Pompeian painters
Painters from Naples
French painters
Year of birth uncertain
1760s births
19th-century Italian male artists
18th-century Italian male artists